Isabel Reuss Gerding (born April 10, 1962) is a Mexican Olympic freestyle swimmer who participated in the 1980 Summer Olympics for her native country.

Her best result in Moscow, Soviet Union was a sixth place in the Women's 4 × 100 m Freestyle Relay.

As of March 2008, she still holds the oldest swimming Mexican Record with her 2:04.19 in the 200 free (long course) from the 1982 World Championships.

References

External links

1962 births
Living people
Mexican people of German descent
Mexican female swimmers
Mexican female freestyle swimmers
Swimmers at the 1979 Pan American Games
Swimmers at the 1980 Summer Olympics
Olympic swimmers of Mexico
Place of birth missing (living people)
Pan American Games bronze medalists for Mexico
Pan American Games medalists in swimming
Central American and Caribbean Games gold medalists for Mexico
Central American and Caribbean Games medalists in swimming
Competitors at the 1982 Central American and Caribbean Games
Medalists at the 1979 Pan American Games
20th-century Mexican women
21st-century Mexican women